Shasta County, officially the County of Shasta, is a county in the northern portion of the U.S. state of California. Its population is 182,155 as of the 2020 census, up from 177,223 from the 2010 census. The county seat is Redding.

Shasta County comprises the Redding, California metropolitan statistical area. The county occupies the northern reaches of the Sacramento Valley, with portions extending into the southern reaches of the Cascade Range.

Points of interest in Shasta County include Shasta Lake, Lassen Peak, and the Sundial Bridge.

History
Shasta County was one of the original counties of California, created in 1850 at the time of statehood. The county was named after Mount Shasta; the name is derived from the English equivalent for the Shasta people. Their population declined in the 1850s due to disease, low birth rates, starvation, killings, and massacres, as White settlers moved in. The name of the tribe was spelled in various ways until the present version was used when the county was established. Originally, Mt. Shasta was within the county, but it is now part of Siskiyou County, to the north. Its 14,179-foot (4,322 m) peak is visible throughout most of Shasta County. Parts of the county's territory were transferred to Siskiyou County in 1852, and to Tehama County in 1856.

Geography
Mountains line the county on the east, north, and west. The Sacramento River flows out of the mountains to the north, through the center of the county, and toward the Sacramento Valley to the south.

Flora and fauna
According to Willis Linn Jepson, the biota of Shasta County was not explored in a scientific manner until just before 1900. Until the 1920s, the Southern Pacific Railroad Company owned vast tracts of natural grasslands, but during the 1920s, the railroad sold off much of its grassland holdings, leading to the rapid clearing of brush and large-scale conversion from habitat to agricultural uses. Shasta County has extensive forests, which cover over one half the land area with commercially productive forest systems. Common forest alliances include mixed-oak woodland and mixed conifer-oak woodland, as well as Douglas fir forest. Common trees found include white-bark pine, California black oak, and California buckeye.

Adjacent counties
 Siskiyou County – north
 Modoc County – northeast
 Lassen County – east
 Plumas County – southeast
 Tehama County – south
 Trinity County – west

National protected areas
 Shasta-Trinity National Forest (part)
 Whiskeytown National Recreation Area (part)

Demographics

2011

Places by population, race, and income

2010
The 2010 United States Census reported that Shasta County had a population of 177,223. The racial makeup of Shasta County was 153,726 (86.7%) White, 1,548 (0.9%) African American, 4,950 (2.8%) Native American, 4,391 (2.5%) Asian, 271 (0.2%) Pacific Islander, 4,501 (2.5%) from other races, and 7,836 (4.4%) from two or more races.  Hispanics or Latinos of any race were 14,878 persons (8.4%).

2000

As of the census of 2000, 163,256 people, 63,426 households, and 44,017 families were residing in the county. The population density was 43 people per square mile (17/km2). The 68,810 housing units had an average density of 18 per square mile (7/km2). The racial makeup of the county was 89.3% White, 0.8% African American, 2.8% Native American, 1.9% Asian, 0.1% [Pacific Islander, 1.7% from other races, and 3.5% from two or more races. About 5.5% of the population were Hispanic or Latino of any race. About 15.7% were of German, 12.3% English, 11.2% Irish, 9.9% American, and 5.2% Italian ancestry according to Census 2000; 94.0% spoke English and 3.3% Spanish as their first language.

Of the 63,426 households, 31.7% had children under 18 living with them, 53.0% were married couples living together, 11.9% had a female householder with no husband present, and 30.6% were not families. About 24.7% of all households were made up of individuals, and 10.2% had someone living alone who was 65 or older. The average household size was 2.52, and the average family size was 2.98.

In the county, theage distribution was 26.1% under 18, 8.2% from 18 to 24, 25.3% from 25 to 44, 25.2% from 45 to 64, and 15.2% who were 65 or older. The median age was 39 years. For every 100 females, there were 95.1 males. For every 100 females 18 and over, there were 91.2 males.

The median income for a household in the county was $34,335, and for a family was $40,491. Males had a median income of $35,959 versus $24,773 for females. The per capita income for the county was $17,738. About 11.3% of families and 15.4% of the population were below the poverty line, including 21.0% of those under age 18 and 7.3% of those age 65 or over.

Annual events

 Kool April Nites (April): A classic car show
 Rodeo Week Festivities (May)
 Art Fair and Fiddler's Jamboree (May)
 Whiskeytown Regatta (May)
 Watershed Festival (May)
 Strawberry Festival (May)
 Shasta Dragonwood Celtic Faire (May)
 Redding Exchange Club Air Show (June)
 Shasta District Fair (June)
 Fall River Valley Century Bike Ride (July)
 Fourth of July Fireworks Celebration (July)
 Burney Basin Days (July)
 Fall River Valley Wild Rice Festival (Aug)
 Intermountain Fair, Fall River Valley (September) The Shasta County Fair
 Stillwater Pow Wow (September)
 Walk To End Alzheimer's (September)
 Big Bike Weekend (October)
 Fall River Valley Lights of Christmas Parade (December)
 Palo Cedro Honey Bee Festival (September)

Politics

Shasta at one time favored the Democratic Party in Presidential elections. It went Democratic in all but one presidential election from 1932 to 1976, and was one of the few counties in the state to be won by George McGovern. However, since 1980, it has become one of the most Republican counties in the state in Presidential and congressional elections. The last Democrat to carry the county in a presidential race was Jimmy Carter in 1976.

The Board of Supervisors cancelled its contract with Dominion Voting Systems in 2023 to pursue other options including the possibility of counting votes by hand.

Voter registration statistics

Cities by population and voter registration

Transportation

Major highways
 Interstate 5
 State Route 36
 State Route 44
 State Route 89
 State Route 151
 State Route 273
 State Route 299

Public transportation
Redding Area Bus Authority (RABA) provides service in and around Redding. One route operates to Burney via State Route 299.

Amtrak's Coast Starlight serves Redding Station once a day in each direction.

Airports
Redding Municipal Airport has scheduled passenger flights. Other (general aviation) airports within the county include Benton Field (near Redding), Fall River Mills Airport, and Shingletown Airport.

Law enforcement

Sheriff
The Shasta County sheriff provides prison administration and coroner services for the entire county, and patrol, investigative, and coroner services for the unincorporated portions of the county.

Municipal police
Redding and Anderson have municipal police departments.

Crime 
The following table includes the number of incidents reported and the rate per 1,000 persons for each type of offense.

Cities by population and crime rates

Education
School districts include:

Unified:
 Fall River Joint Unified School District
 Gateway Unified School District

Secondary:
 Anderson Union High School District
 Dunsmuir Joint Union High School District
 Red Bluff Joint Union High School District
 Shasta Union High School District

Elementary:

 Antelope Elementary School District
 Bella Vista Elementary School District
 Black Butte Union Elementary School District
 Cascade Union Elementary School District
 Castle Rock Union Elementary School District
 Columbia Elementary School District
 Cottonwood Union Elementary School District
 Enterprise Elementary School District
 French Gulch-Whiskeytown Elementary School District
 Grant Elementary School District
 Happy Valley Union Elementary School District
 Igo, Ono, Platina Union Elementary School District
 Indian Springs Elementary School District
 Junction Elementary School District
 Millville Elementary School District
 Mountain Union Elementary School District
 North Cow Creek Elementary School District
 Oak Run Elementary School District
 Pacheco Union Elementary School District
 Redding Elementary School District
 Shasta Union Elementary School District
 Whitmore Union Elementary School District

High schools and below
 43 elementary schools
 10 junior high schools
 8 high schools
 35 private schools

Colleges and universities
Shasta County has four colleges and universities:
 Shasta College, Redding: 2-year, fully accredited
 Simpson University, Redding: 4-year, fully accredited
 National University, Redding: 4-year, fully accredited
 Shasta Bible College: 4-year

Healthcare
The board of supervisors issued a declaration opposing state vaccine mandates and fired the health officer after an election brought changes to the board.

Housing
 The median price for a house is about $365,000 as reported by USA Today on April 12, 2022.
 The median rental rate for a two-bedroom apartment was $1,255/month.

Points of interest

 Shasta Dam - second-largest dam in US
 Lassen Peak
 Lassen Volcanic National Park
 Shasta Lake
 Turtle Bay Exploration Park
 Hat Creek Radio Observatory
 Iron Mountain Mine - one of the nation's most toxic waste sites
 Sundial Bridge/Turtle Bay, an architectural beauty and a natural habitat area surrounded by urbanization
 Burney Falls
 Whiskeytown Dam and Lake, with John F. Kennedy Memorial

Communities

Cities
 Anderson
 Redding
 Shasta Lake

Census-designated places

 Bella Vista
 Big Bend
 Burney
 Cassel
 Castella
 Centerville
 Cottonwood
 Fall River Mills
 French Gulch
 Happy Valley
 Hat Creek
 Igo
 Johnson Park
 Jones Valley
 Keswick
 Lakehead
 McArthur
 Millville
 Montgomery Creek
 Mountain Gate
 Oak Run
 Old Station
 Ono
 Palo Cedro
 Platina
 Round Mountain
 Shasta
 Shingletown
 Whitmore

Other unincorporated communities

 Beegum
 Dana
 Enterprise
 Ingot
 Motion
 O'Brien
 Pollard Flat
 Viola
 Whiskeytown

Population ranking

The population ranking of the following table is based on the 2020 census of Shasta County.
† county seat

See also 
 List of school districts in Shasta County, California
 National Register of Historic Places listings in Shasta County, California
 2018 Shasta County Wildfires: Carr Fire, Hirz Fire, Delta Fire

Notes

References

External links

 
 Shasta Historical Society – large database of historical Shasta County photographs
 Shastasearch.com: Shasta Regional Travel and Resource Guide
 Hiking trails in Shasta County

 
1850 establishments in California
California counties
Populated places established in 1850
Sacramento Valley
Shasta Cascade